Isaka Sawadogo (born 1966), sometimes credited as Issaka Sawadogo, is a Burkinabé actor. He is most noted for his performances in the Canadian film Diego Star, for which he received a Prix Jutra nomination for Best Actor at the 16th Jutra Awards in 2014, and the Dutch film The Paradise Suite, for which he won the Golden Calf for Best Actor at the 2016 Netherlands Film Festival.

In 2020, he appeared in a supporting role in Philippe Lacôte's film Night of the Kings (La Nuit des rois). In 2021 he played the lead role in Jorge Camarotti's short film Ousmane.

References

External links

1966 births
21st-century Burkinabé male actors
Living people
Burkinabé male film actors